Morten Therkildsen is a Danish racing cyclist who represents Denmark in BMX. He has been selected to represent Denmark at the 2012 Summer Olympics in the men's BMX event, finishing in 19th place.

References

Living people
Cyclists at the 2012 Summer Olympics
Olympic cyclists of Denmark
Danish male cyclists
People from Vejle Municipality
1983 births
Sportspeople from the Region of Southern Denmark